Mong Ping Township is a township of Kengtung District (formerly part of Mong Hsat District) in the Shan State of Myanmar. The capital town is Mong Ping.

References

Townships of Shan State
Mongsat District